The Liathmore Sheela-na-gig is part of the northern doorway at the larger church ruin at Liathmore monastic site in the townland of Leigh, Co. Tipperary. Its Sites and Monuments Record no. is TN042-055004.

The former monastic site is on private land, but signposted from the old Dublin-Cork road (as "Liathmore Two Churches").

Description 
Barbara Freitag dates the small sheela-na-gig to the 12th century, while the church she is part of is dated to the 15th. The Sheela-na-gig is lying on her left side with her triangular head with large eyes towards the inside of the church and the feet towards the former round tower (now only the foundations remain). Both arms are in front of the body with the hands touching the vulva on both sides which is indicated by a slit. Both legs are straight.

The figure in low relief on sandstone used to have a floral decoration at her feet which are now defaced; similar carvings survive in the church.

Gallery

See also
Coolaghmore Sheela-na-gig
 Fethard Abbey Sheela-na-gig
Kiltinan Church Sheela-na-gig

References

Sheela na gigs in Ireland
County Tipperary